Douglas James Konieczny (September 27, 1951) is a former Major League Baseball (MLB) pitcher.

Konieczny graduated from St. Ladislaus High School in Hamtramck, Michigan in June of 1969 and was drafted by the Detroit Tigers in the 23rd round but did not sign with them. He was then selected by the Houston Astros in the first-round pick (3rd overall) in the secondary phase of the January 1971 Major League Baseball Draft. He had no decision in his first start, a night game, on September 11, 1973 against the San Diego Padres at San Diego Stadium. Recorded attendance for the game was 1,413. Opposing starting pitcher was Randy Jones. Konieczny pitched six innings giving up six hits, two runs, and had one strike out before being relieved by Jim York.

References

Sources

1951 births
Living people
Baseball players from Detroit
Columbus Astros players
Daytona Beach Astros players
Denver Bears players
Houston Astros players
Major League Baseball pitchers
Memphis Blues players
Tiburones de La Guaira players
American expatriate baseball players in Venezuela
Wayne State Warriors baseball players